John Matthew Atkinson (born December 27, 1987) is an 
American actor and musician. Atkinson was born in Marietta, Georgia. Atkinson's family moved around several times, living in Alabama and Mississippi before settling in Kennesaw, Georgia. After high school, Atkinson moved to Atlanta taking college courses, while simultaneously pursuing acting, eventually moving to Los Angeles. Atkinson is of Native American and Irish descent.

Career

Atkinson made his television debut on The WB/CW drama series One Tree Hill. Atkinson appeared in the Academy Award winning film The Blind Side. Atkinson has also appeared in CSI: Crime Scene Investigation and Drop Dead Diva. Atkinson is best known as Nick Fadden in the ABC Family series, Jane by Design and Austin Travers on The Young and the Restless. Most recently Atkinson has portrayed Finn in the ABC series The Middle and Jason on the ABC Family series Young & Hungry. In March 2019, Atkinson joined the cast of The Bold and the Beautiful as Thomas Forrester.

Filmography

References

Further reading

External links
 
 

1987 births
American male film actors
American male television actors
21st-century American male actors
Living people
People from Marietta, Georgia
American male soap opera actors